Phyu War Thet (born 11 May 1985) is a track and field athlete from Myanmar. She won her first (and currently only) Southeast Asian Games gold medal in the women's 5000 metres at the 2013 Southeast Asian Games in her home country.  She also won silver in the 1500 metres and 10,000 metres races at the same event. She competed barefoot in Southeast Asian Games events before 2013, .

References

External links

All-athletics.com profile

Living people
1985 births
Burmese female long-distance runners
Asian Games competitors for Myanmar
Athletes (track and field) at the 2014 Asian Games
Southeast Asian Games medalists in athletics
Southeast Asian Games gold medalists for Myanmar
Southeast Asian Games silver medalists for Myanmar
Southeast Asian Games bronze medalists for Myanmar
Competitors at the 2001 Southeast Asian Games
Competitors at the 2003 Southeast Asian Games
Competitors at the 2007 Southeast Asian Games
Competitors at the 2011 Southeast Asian Games
Competitors at the 2013 Southeast Asian Games
Competitors at the 2015 Southeast Asian Games